Mackenzie Presbyterian University (Portuguese: Universidade Presbiteriana Mackenzie) is a private university in São Paulo, Brazil.
The Mackenzie Presbyterian University is an institution of higher learning that has strong tradition and history in Brazil. It has campuses for undergraduate and postgraduate studies in São Paulo (Campus Higienópolis), Campinas, Barueri (Campus Alphaville), Brasilia, Curitiba and Rio de Janeiro

Founded in 1870 as the American School, Mackenzie is one of the oldest institutions of higher education in Brazil. The university is regarded nationally and internationally as a center of excellence having graduated numerous important names in Brazilian history.

History

In 1870, the American Presbyterian missionary Rev. George Whitehill Chamberlain and his wife Mary Annesley founded a private grammar school inside their home. The classes were held in their living room and, a few years later, the "American School" was established as a center of excellence in São Paulo. The Chamberlains' American School was revolutionary for the Brazilian standards at that time: no corporal punishment on students was permitted, and both boys and girls could attend classes. Even though the Chamberlains were openly Presbyterians, students from all ethnic backgrounds, social classes, and religious denominations were welcome. The fame of academic rigor allied to religious tolerance soon reached the United States.

In 1896, John Theron Mackenzie, an attorney from Phelps, New York, and his sisters donated US$50,000 "for the establishment of an engineering school to be built under the auspices of Mr. Chamberlain". The Mackenzie building was built the next year, and the college was named in their honor.

After the establishment of Mackenzie College, the institution saw rapid expansion of its activities with the creation of a School of Architecture, a School of Economics, and a Law School, gaining the status of university in 1952.

Notable alumni
In 130 years of history (as of 2000), it is estimated that Mackenzie University has 300,000 alumni, many of them important personalities of Brazilian politics and civil society. Among them surrealist artist André Breton is claimed as an alumnus, although this might reflect a mixup with his friend and collaborator Benjamin Péret, who lived in Brazil in 1929-1931; modernist painter Anita Malfatti; Brazil's most known basketball player Oscar Schmidt; car racer Émerson Fittipaldi; sea explorer Amyr Klink; Olympic golden medalist Robert Scheidt; journalists Boris Casoy and Ney Gonçalves Dias; businessmen Márcio Cypriano (CEO Bradesco), Ivan Zurita (CEO Nestlé, Brasil), Danilo Talanskas (Otis Elevator Company) and Emerson Kapaz; jurists Álvaro Villaça Azevedo and Carlos Miguel Aidar (former Brazilian Law Society President); Brazilian Supreme Court Justice Eros Roberto Grau; lawyer and scholar Antonio Carlos Rodrigues do Amaral; lawyer José Roberto Batochio; legal scholar Sérgio Pinto Martins (judge and labor law scholar), Roberto Justus; Tales Castelo Branco; and architect Paulo Mendes da Rocha.

Schools and colleges

 School of Engineering
 Graduate School of Theology
 School of Architecture and City Planning
 Biological Sciences and Health College (CCBS, former FCBEE)
 College of Economics, Accounting, Business and Marketing (CCSA)
 College of Computer Science and Information Technology
 College of Communication and the Arts
 School of Law
 College of Physical Education
 College of Philosophy, Language, and Education
 College of Psychology

Other information

MackGraphe 
MackGraphe is the Graphene and Nanomaterials Research Center at Mackenzie Presbyterian University, which aims to master processes in all stages of technology development, from the modeling of nanomaterials to their application. MackGraphe expects to have a huge impact on society by developing new technologies to fulfil their needs.

See also
 Brazil University Rankings
 Universities and Higher Education in Brazil

References

External links

 Official site

 
Educational institutions established in 1870
1870 establishments in Brazil
Presbyterian universities and colleges
Universities and colleges in São Paulo
Christian universities and colleges in Brazil
Universities and colleges in São Paulo (state)